Seneca Valley High School (SVHS) is a U.S. public high school (grades 9-12) in Germantown, Maryland. It is part of the Montgomery County Public Schools system. Its enrollment for the 2019–2020 school year was 1,226 students. The new building was completed in 2021, which has a capacity of 2,551 students.

History 

Seneca Valley High School sits on land which was once the site of a dairy farm owned by baseball player Walter Perry Johnson, having been purchased by him in 1935. Johnson lived there with his five children and his mother, as his wife died, until his death in 1946.

1970s 
Seneca Valley High School opened in 1974 as the first high school in Germantown and remained the only one until 1998, when Northwest High School opened. In its first year of operation, the 1974 to 1975 school year, under Principal Nathan Pearson, Seneca Valley hosted students grades seven through ten. In the following 1975 to 1976 school year, the school operated grades nine through eleven, with 8th graders transferring to the newly opened Ridgeview Junior High School in Gaithersburg, Maryland. During the 1976 to 1977 school year, Seneca Valley transformed into what was then a senior high school, hosting grades ten through twelve, graduating its first class in June 1977.

1980s 
Finally in 1988, Seneca Valley changed to the present state of full-fledged high school with grades 9-12.

1990s 
The class of 1992, was the first to graduate all upper high school years in one facility.

2010s 
The original school building, inaugurated in 1974, was demolished in 2020 and replaced with a new building on-site in 2021. Construction work began in September 2017 and was completed in September 2020. The new building is the largest high school in the State of Maryland, and will draw students from the former Clarksburg High School boundary area.

Sports 
The school colors are kelly green and gold, and the mascot is the Screamin' Eagle. Seneca Valley's football biggest rivalry is with Damascus High School.

Seneca Valley's football team is one of the most accomplished public school programs in Maryland history. They have a record 12 state football championships, with the most recent title coming in 2002. Seneca Valley won the state title in 1976, 1977, 1979, 1980, 1987, 1992, 1993, 1994, 1997, 1998, 1999, and 2002.

Notable alumni 
 Mark Bryan (1985), lead guitarist for Hootie and the Blowfish
 Neil Fallon (1989), vocalist for Clutch
 Dean Felber (1985), bass guitarist for Hootie and the Blowfish
 Jean-Paul Gaster (1989), drummer for Clutch
 Dan Maines (1989), bass guitarist for Clutch
 Andre Smith (2006), former football player in the NFL
 Paula White (1984), Televangelist and Pastor, Paula White Ministries

References

External links 

 Seneca Valley Football
 Seneca Valley Lacrosse
 Seneca Valley Class of 1979 Alumni
 
 

1974 establishments in Maryland
Educational institutions established in 1974
Germantown, Maryland
International Baccalaureate schools in Maryland
Public high schools in Montgomery County, Maryland